Smart & Biggar is the common name and brand for the Canadian law firm Smart & Biggar LLP and the patent and trademark agency Smart & Biggar IP Agency Co. (formerly Fetherstonhaugh & Co). Smart & Biggar is widely regarded as one of Canada's highest-ranked intellectual property law firms. 

Smart & Biggar has over 100 intellectual property lawyers, patent agents and trademark agents across its five offices in Ottawa, Toronto, Montréal, Vancouver and Calgary. It is also the largest firm in Canada focused purely on IP and related specialty areas of law.

History
The firm was founded in Toronto by Frederick Fetherstonhaugh in 1890 as a patent firm known as Fetherstonhaugh & Co. Fetherstonhaugh was a patent attorney from Mimico who was well known for having one of the first electrified homes in Toronto as well as owning the first electric car in Ontario, which was created by William Joseph Still in 1893. 

An Ottawa office was established in 1895, and was joined by Russel S. Smart in 1904. Smart joined as a patent agent at the age of 19 with only a mechanical engineering degree from the University of Toronto, and he was later called to the Bar of Quebec in 1911 and to the Bar of Ontario in 1922. He was made a partner of the firm in 1913 with the patent agency then known as Fetherstonhaugh & Co., while the law firm was rebranded as Fetherstonhaugh & Smart.

Fetherstonhaugh was joined in 1923 by Harold G. Fox to create the patent agency Fetherstonhaugh & Fox in Toronto. In 1927, Oliver M. Biggar joined the partnership at the behest of Smart to form Smart & Biggar.

One of the best-known successes in the firm's early years came in the case of Lightning Fastener v. Colonial Fastener, where Fox, along with Smart and Biggar, successfully represented Lightning Fastener Co. and Dr. Gideon Sundback in a patent infringement action for their patent on an early version of the zipper.

References

Further reading
An article providing details on Oliver M. Biggar can be found in The Toronto Saturday Night, December 23, 1944, "Biggar is in shape again to help Canada get along in the world".
Bill Sherk, The Way We Drove, pg 4 – 5, Stoddart Publishing Co. Limited, 1993

External links 

Intellectual property law firms
Law firms established in 1926
Law firms of Canada